The North American Racquets Association is the governing body for the sport of racquets in the United States and Canada.

Member clubs

 Tennis and Racquet Club (Boston)
 Racquet Club of Chicago
 Detroit Racquet Club
 Montreal Racket Club
 Racquet Club of Philadelphia
 Racquet and Tennis Club (New York City)
 Tuxedo Club

External links
 North American Racquets Association

Rackets (sport)
Sports governing bodies in Canada
Racquets